Gonbadli may refer to:
 Gonbadli, North Khorasan
 Gonbadli, Razavi Khorasan